Events in the year 2018 in Bulgaria.

Incumbents
 President: Rumen Radev
 Prime Minister: Boyko Borisov

Events 

  March - Bulgarian National Union – New Democracy had a nationalist rally with More than 1,000 far-right supporters, Shouting slogans such as "Freedom or death!" and "All communists to court! Bulgaria is taking a new nationalist path!. Members of nationalist groups from a number of other European countries such as the Sweden's Nordic Resistance Movement also took part.

Deaths

15 January – Mariana Alamancheva, actress (b. 1941).

13 February – Dobri Dobrev, ascetic and philanthropist (b. 1914).

25 February – Tsvetan Veselinov, footballer (b. 1947).

10 June – Rumen Petkov, animator, painter and comic creator (b. 1948).

References

 
2010s in Bulgaria
Years of the 21st century in Bulgaria
Bulgaria
Bulgaria